is a Japanese wrestler. He competed in the men's freestyle welterweight at the 1964 Summer Olympics.

References

1944 births
Living people
Japanese male sport wrestlers
Olympic wrestlers of Japan
Wrestlers at the 1964 Summer Olympics
Place of birth missing (living people)
World Wrestling Championships medalists